Lenger is a city in Kazakhstan.

Lenger may also refer to:

Lenger, Bozyazı, village in Mersin Province, Turkey

People with the surname
Blaž Lenger (1919–2006), Croatian singer
Frédérique Lenger (1921–2005), Belgian mathematics educator